Mount Pleasant Township is a township in Atchison County, Kansas, United States. As of the 2010 census, its population was 864.

History
Mount Pleasant Township was established in 1855 as one of the three original townships of Atchison County.

Geography
According to the USGS, it contains two cemeteries: Fairview and Round Mound.

The streams of Camp Creek, Crooked Creek and Spring Creek run through this township.

References
 USGS Geographic Names Information System (GNIS)

External links
 US-Counties.com
 City-Data.com

Townships in Atchison County, Kansas
Townships in Kansas
1855 establishments in Kansas Territory